Luca Castelnuovo and Manuel Guinard were the defending champions but chose not to defend their title.

Robin Haase and Sem Verbeek won the title after defeating Nicolás Barrientos and Miguel Ángel Reyes-Varela 6–4, 3–6, [10–7] in the final.

Seeds

Draw

References

External links
 Main draw

Dutch Open - Doubles
2022 Doubles